Khmer (released 1997 in Germany by ECM Records (ECM 1560) – 537 798-2) is an album by the Norwegian trumpeter Nils Petter Molvær. The album mixes elements of electronica and jazz.

The album is based on sampled and artificially generated sounds, backed by beats from house and drum'n'bass. However, the often very slow rhythms are played on acoustic drums.

Reception 
Christian Genzel of Allmusic review awarded the album 4.5 stars. He wrote, "Khmer is surely the most unusual album ever released by ECM" due to the CD's then-unprecedented mix of jazz and electronica.

Track listing 
 «Khmer» (4:59) Drums – Rune Arnesen E-bow (guitar), sampler – Eivind Aarset Percussion, dulcimer – Roger Ludvigsen Trumpet, percussion, sampler – Nils Petter Molvær
 «Tløn» (7:52) Drums – Rune Arnesen Effects (guitar treatments), performer (talk box) – Eivind Aarset Guitar – Morten Mølster Sampler – Ulf W. Ø. Holand Trumpet, bass, sampler – Nils Petter Molvær
 Felles spor (5:50) Drums – Rune Arnesen Effects – Reidar Skår Guitar – Eivind Aarset Sampler – Ulf W. Ø. Holand Trumpet, bass, sampler, guitar – Nils Petter Molvær
 «Access»
 «Song of Sand I»
 «On Stream» (5:01) Guitar – Eivind Aarset & Morten Mølster Sampler – Ulf W. Ø. Holand Trumpet, bass, sampler – Nils Petter Molvær
 «Platonic Years» (6:33) Drums – Rune Arnesen Featuring (samples) – Ab und Zu Featuring (sample production) – Bill Laswell Guitar – Morten Mølster Guitar (ambient), sampler – Eivind Aarset Trumpet, bass, sampler – Nils Petter Molvær
 «Phum» (3:39) Acoustic guitar – Roger Ludvigsen Trumpet, sampler – Nils Petter Molvær
 «Song of Sand II» (6:10) Drums – Rune Arnesen Guitar – Eivind Aarset Sampler – Ulf W. Ø. Holand Trumpet, bass, sampler, guitar – Nils Petter Molvær
 «Exit» (2:42) Acoustic guitar – Roger Ludvigsen E-bow (guitar) – Eivind Aarset Sampler (percussion) – Nils Petter Molvær

Credits 
 Composer – Nils Petter Molvær
 Design – Sascha Kleis
 Engineer – Ulf W. Ø. Holand*
 Cover photography – John Gollings
 Photography (liner photo) – Knut Strand
 Producer – Manfred Eicher, Ulf W. Ø. Holand
 Production – ECM

Notes 
 Recorded 1996–97 at Lydlab A/S, Oslo.
 Track 5 contains samples from the albums: "Axiom Ambient: Lost In The Translation" Courtesy of Axiom / Island Records; "Totally" Courtesy of Curling Legs Productions
 The cover shows the statue "Les Lutteurs". The photography was reproduced from the Galeries Nationales du Grand Palais exhibition catalogue "Angkor et dix siècles d'art khmer”, Paris 1997
 All compositions published by ECM Verlag ℗ 1997 ECM Records GmbH © 1997 ECM Records GmbH
 This CD was partly supported by "Fond for Utøvende Kunstnere” and NOPA

References

External links 
 Nils Petter Molvær Official Website

1997 albums
Nils Petter Molvær albums